John Riley "Jack" Driscoll (May 9, 1924 – July 10, 2014) was an American politician and businessman.

Driscoll was born on May 9, 1924, in Whitinsville, Massachusetts, an unincorporated village in Northbridge, Massachusetts. He served in the United States Army Air Forces during World War II. In 1948 he received his bachelor's degree from the College of the Holy Cross.

Driscoll worked a sales representative for Metropolitan Life Insurance for 31 years.

Driscoll was prompted to run for a seat in the Massachusetts House of Representatives after hearing Speaker David M. Bartley comment that House leadership had to overcome the inability of state representatives to make decisions. He first ran in 1974, a year Republicans were not expected to win due to the Watergate scandal, however he was elected by 452 votes.

During his tenure in the House, Driscoll rarely sponsored legislation, but instead worked behind the scenes. He forged strong ties within his district through his constituent work and was considered by local Democrats to be unbeatable. In 1992, he chose not to run for reelection.

Driscoll died on July 10, 2014, in Belmont, Massachusetts.

Notes

1924 births
2014 deaths
People from Northbridge, Massachusetts
College of the Holy Cross alumni
United States Army Air Forces soldiers
Businesspeople from Massachusetts
Republican Party members of the Massachusetts House of Representatives
20th-century American businesspeople
United States Army Air Forces personnel of World War II